Włodzimierz 'Włodek' Leonard Lubański (born 28 February 1947 in Gliwice-Sośnica) is a former Polish football striker, the second all-time highest goal scorer for the Polish national team. For his national team, Lubański amassed 75 caps between 1963 and 1980, scoring 48 goals and being the second highest goalscorer in Poland's football history behind Robert Lewandowski.

Life and career
Born in Gliwice in 1947, he started his football career at the age of ten in Sośnica Gliwice junior team. Between 1958–1962, he was part of the GKS Gliwice junior squad and in 1963 he started playing football professionally in Górnik Zabrze. He won the Polish Championship seven tiems with Górnik Zabrze in 1963, 1964, 1965, 1966, 1967, 1971 and 1972.

Between 1975–1982, he played in KSC Lokeren and subsequently between 1982–1983 in Valenciennes FC.

He won gold medal at the 1972 Summer Olympics in the men's football team competition with Poland.

In 1972, he was awarded the title of Merited Master of Sport of the USSR.

He participated at the 1978 FIFA World Cup finishing fifth with the Polish national team.

Lubański was vice-chairman at Polonia Warszawa for three months.

Lubański is the youngest scorer in the history of the European Cup (now known as the UEFA Champions League), netting for Polish outfit Górnik Zabrze against Czech side Dukla Prague in the leg of their tie in the first round of the competition on 13 November 1963, aged 16 years and 258 days.

In 1997, he received the Officer's Cross of the Order of Polonia Restituta for his "outstanding contributions to the development of sport in Poland".

In 2015, he was awarded the Commander's Cross of the Order of Merit of the Republic of Poland.

Personal life
In 1968, he married Grażyna (née Loreto) with whom he has two children: a son Michał and a daughter Małgorzata.

Lubański is the subject of a number of books including Ja, Lubański by Krzysztof Wyrzykowski (1990), Włodek Lubański. Legenda polskiego futbolu by Włodzimierz Lubański and Przemysław Słowiński (2008) and Życie jak dobry mecz by Włodzimierz Lubański and Michał Olszański (2016).

Career statistics

Internationals goals

See also
Sport in Poland
List of Polish football players

References

1947 births
Living people
Sportspeople from Gliwice
Polish footballers
Poland international footballers
UEFA Golden Players
Górnik Zabrze players
K.S.C. Lokeren Oost-Vlaanderen players
Valenciennes FC players
Footballers at the 1972 Summer Olympics
Olympic footballers of Poland
1978 FIFA World Cup players
Olympic gold medalists for Poland
Ekstraklasa players
Belgian Pro League players
Quimper Kerfeunteun F.C. players
Ligue 1 players
Ligue 2 players
Polish expatriate footballers
Expatriate footballers in Belgium
Expatriate footballers in France
Olympic medalists in football
Honoured Masters of Sport of the USSR
Polish football managers
K.R.C. Mechelen managers
K.S.C. Lokeren Oost-Vlaanderen managers
Medalists at the 1972 Summer Olympics
Association football forwards
PAS Giannina F.C. managers